Horace Aloysius Nelson (February 16, 1878 – 1962) was an American Penobscot political leader and the father of dancer and actress Molly Spotted Elk (born Mary Alice Nelson).

Early life and education 
Nelson was born to Peter "Dindy" Nelson and Mary Francis Mitchell Nelson on Indian Island, a Penobscot reservation near Old Town, Maine. He attended Old Town High School and, at age 22, was the second Penobscot to graduate (after baseball player Louis Sockalexis). He was the first to study at Dartmouth College, graduating around 1904.

Career 
Nelson served as the Penobscot Representative in the Maine Legislature from 1921 to 1922 and as the Penobscot governor from 1939 to 1941. In addition to trapping, fishing, and gathering sweet-grass for his wife, Philomene Saulis Nelson (1888–1977), to make baskets from, which were standard tasks for Penobscot men, Nelson also contributed to the family household by keeping a vegetable garden and he had a variety of paid jobs such as ferry master to Indian Island, surveyor, security guard, and laborer working for a shipbuilder and a railroad company. Music was his hobby and he occasionally played for the Penobscot Indian Band and encouraged his children to play music.

Sources

1878 births
Members of the Maine House of Representatives
1962 deaths
Penobscot people
Dartmouth College alumni
Native American state legislators in Maine
Native American people from Maine
People from Penobscot Indian Island Reservation
20th-century Native Americans